Bulbophyllum macphersonii, commonly known as eyelash orchids, is a species of epiphytic or lithophytic orchid that is endemic to Queensland. It has tiny, crowded, slightly flattened, dark green pseudobulbs, a single thick, fleshy leaf and a single dark red to purplish red flower with a narrow labellum. It grows on trees and rocks in sheltered places.

Description
Bulbophyllum macphersonii is an epiphytic or lithophytic herb that forms dense clumps. It has a fringe of long, fine hairs and vibrates in the slightest breeze. Flowering occurs between March and August.

Taxonomy and naming
The small eyelash orchid was first formally described in 1934 by Herman Rupp and the description was published in The Victorian Naturalist. It had previously been described in 1884 by Frederick Manson Bailey, intending his description to be published in Robert D. Fitzgerald's book Australian Orchids. Fitzgerald died before the volume was published but it was later published by Arthur Stopps and Henry Deane who considered the orchid to belong to the monotypic genus Osyricera. With Bailey's approval, the description was published as Osyricera purpurascens. In 1905, Johannes Jacobus Smith changed the name of Osyricera purpurascens to Bulbophyllum purpurascens, but that name had already been used for a different orchid and was therefore a nomen illegitimum. The specific epithet (macphersonii) honours Ken PacPherson who "rediscovered" the species in 1933.

The names of two varieties of this orchid are accepted by the World Checklist of Selected Plant Families:
 Bulbophyllum macphersonii var. macphersonii - the small eyelash orchid;
 Bulbophyllum macphersonii var. spathulatum – the large eyelash orchid which is larger in all its parts. It has also been known as Bulbophyllum sladeanum A.D.Hawkes and Blepharochilum sladeanum.(A.D.Hawkes) D.L.Jones & M.A.Clem.

Distribution and habitat
Bulbophyllum newportii grows on trees, rocks and cliff faces in sheltered rainforest and open forest. It is found between the Cedar Bay National Park, the Atherton Tableland and Rockhampton.

References

macphersonii
Orchids of Queensland
Endemic orchids of Australia
Plants described in 1934